The Jazz of Tacoma were a professional basketball team based in Tacoma, Washington which were members of the International Basketball League (IBL) from 2007 to 2009. This is not the first attempt at a professional basketball franchise in Tacoma. The Tacoma Thunder played for two seasons in the league and were replaced by a franchise named the Tacoma Jets, who never took to the courts, having been replaced by the Jazz. In 2009, the team was replaced by the Tacoma Tide.

See also
Bellingham Slam
Olympia Reign
Seattle Mountaineers

External links
Team page on IBL Website

International Basketball League teams
Basketball teams in Washington (state)
Sports in Tacoma, Washington
2007 establishments in Washington (state)
2009 disestablishments in Washington (state)
Basketball teams established in 2007
Basketball teams disestablished in 2009